Macrocheilus crampeli is a species of ground beetle in the subfamily Anthiinae. It was described by Alluaud in 1916.

References

Anthiinae (beetle)
Beetles described in 1916